Road to Rocío (Spanish: Camino del Rocío) is a 1966 Spanish musical film directed by Rafael Gil and starring Carmen Sevilla, Francisco Rabal and Arturo Fernández. It was the third version of the story to be filmed following The White Dove (1942) and It Happened in Seville (1955).

The film's sets were designed by Enrique Alarcón.

Cast
Carmen Sevilla as Esperanza Aguilar  
Francisco Rabal as José Antonio  
Arturo Fernández as Alberto Echeve  
Guillermo Marín as Fernando Aguilar  
Concha Goyanes as Mª Jesús Aguilar  
María Luisa Ponte as Martina  
Sancho Gracia as Médico  
Robert Royal as Robert Burton  
Antonia Imperio as La Guadaira  
José Orjas as administrator 
Julia Caba Alba as Rosa 
Alicia Hermida as Setefilla

References

External links

1966 musical films
Spanish musical films
Films based on works by Alejandro Pérez Lugín
Films directed by Rafael Gil
Films set in Seville
Remakes of Spanish films
Films scored by Augusto Algueró
1960s Spanish films
1960s Spanish-language films